Statistics of Latvian Higher League in the 1984 season.

Overview
It was contested by 12 teams, and Torpedo won the championship.

League standings

External links
 RSSSF

Latvian SSR Higher League
Football 
Latvia